Ostrów County is a county in Masovian Voivodeship, east-central Poland. Its seat is located in the town of Ostrów Mazowiecka, with the only other town of the county being Brok. The county was established on 1 January 1999, and historically existed from 1919 to 1939, in the Białystok Voivodeship, Second Polish Republic, and in 1939, in the Warsaw Voivodeship.

As of 2019 its total population is 72,558, out of which the population of Ostrów Mazowiecka is 22,489, that of Brok is 1,941, and the rural population is 48,128.

Neighbouring counties
Ostrów County is bordered by Łomża County to the north, Zambrów County to the north-east, Wysokie Mazowieckie County to the east, Sokołów County and Węgrów County to the south, Wyszków County to the south-west, and Ostrołęka County to the north-west.

Administrative division
The county is subdivided into 11 gminas (one urban, one urban-rural and nine rural). These are listed in the following table, in descending order of population.

References

 
Land counties of Masovian Voivodeship
States and territories established in 1919
States and territories established in 1999
States and territories disestablished in 1939